Marymount Hospital is a 322-bed acute-care facility located in Garfield Heights, Ohio. The hospital primarily serves southern and southeastern Cuyahoga County. Marymount provides cancer care, cardiology, diabetes, emergency, orthopaedics, outpatient rehabilitation, stroke care, vascular surgery, and women's health. The hospital campus also includes a medical office building, a behavioral health center, Critical Care Tower and Surgery Center.

History
In 1908, the Sisters of St. Joseph of the Third Order of St. Francis came from their motherhouse in Stevens Point, Wisconsin to Ohio to staff schools in Polish parishes. A provincial convent was established in 1926. In 1939, there was a shortage of hospital beds and emergency treatment facilities in the city. The Sisters of Saint Joseph of the Third Order of Saint Francis joined with a group of physicians to solve this problem. They started an advisory board in 1945. Four years later, they received to purchase 15 acres of land next to the Provincial Convent. They borrowed $750,000 to break ground on the facility's building. Marymount Hospital officially opened its doors in October 1949 as a not-for-profit acute-care hospital in Garfield Heights, Ohio, a suburb of Cleveland. The 125-bed hospital was run by the Sisters of Saint Joseph.

Founders of Marymount Hospital include Mother Mary Theobold, Warren Chase, Chester Jablonski, and Edmund Lewandowski. Mother Mary Theobold designed the statue of the Virgin Mary under the title "Our Lady of Grace" that still stands at the hospital main entrance today.

During the 1950s and 60s, the hospital, led by the Sisters of Saint Joseph, expanded bed capacity, clinical services, and nearly tripled its bed count to 270. In 1959, Saint Joseph's Teaching Annex was added to make room for the School of Practical Nursing that was established in 1960. Soon after, Marymount expanded its services to include medicine, surgery, obstetrics, pediatrics, and psychiatry, outpatient care through the emergency room, and customary diagnosis and therapy services to x-ray and laboratory services. Additionally, Marymount was one of the first hospitals to have a coronary unit, an in-house nurse-training program, psychiatric services, and clinical engineering. 
In 1980, another wave of renovations and expansions began as well as supportive endeavors with St. Alexis Hospital Medical Center  and Saint Vincent Charity Hospital and Health Center. Marymount Hospital joined the University Hospitals Case Medical Center of Cleveland network of affiliates in 1990. In 1995, the hospital, along with seven other nearby community hospitals, became part of Cleveland Clinic. The partnership provides residents the ability to access the physicians and technology of Cleveland Clinic's medical and research center. Both entities were now able to share resources and create efficiencies in clinical and operational areas.

Today
Cleveland Clinic Marymount Hospital has now had its 67th anniversary  and the Sisters of St. Joseph of the Third Order of St. Francis continue their role as founder and sponsor. The Sisters remain actively involved in the governance and strategic planning of the hospital. Today, Marymount staffs more than 550  Cleveland Clinic and private practice physicians and specialists. These physicians are assisted by more than 1600  employees throughout the hospital. 
Marymount is accredited by The Joint Commission, the Commission on Cancer, and College of American Pathologists. It is also certified by The Joint Commission as a Primary Stroke Center and has received The Gold Plus Stroke Quality Achievement Award. 
Intergenerational Health and Education Campus  
Located on a 52-acre intergenerational campus, Marymount Hospital combines education, Franciscan spirituality, and health care in conjunction with the Sisters of St. Joseph of the Third Order of St. Francis. The campus hosts Marymount Hospital, Village at Marymount, Trinity High School, Marymount Child Care Center, The Franciscan Center, outdoor Stations of the Cross, national Shrines of the Sacred Heart, Our Lady of Czestochowa, and the original Convent.
Marymount Medical Center, Broadview Heights 
Marymount Medical Center opened in 1986 with services in emergency-care, primary and specialty care, diagnostic laboratory, and imaging services. The Emergency Department serves about 10,000 patients per year with a six-bed ED. These issues can range from a sore throat to symptoms of a stroke. The department is staffed by board-certified emergency medicine physicians and nurses. Marymount Medical Center is also certified in cardiac life support, advanced trauma life support, and pediatric life support. 
In addition to treating walk-in patients, emergency squads from surrounding communities bring patients to the ED. Patients requiring more specialized or inpatient care are stabilized and transferred to Marymount Hospital or the hospital of their choice by ambulance or helicopter.
Marymount Medical Center, Broadview Heights also has physicians that specialize in acupuncture, neurology, pain management, podiatry, and spinal issues. 
Marymount Hospital Ambulatory Surgery Center  
Marymount Hospital Ambulatory Surgery Center located on Transportation Blvd. provides advanced multi-specialty outpatient surgery for a variety of medical specialties.

Products and services
Specialty Services:
 Behavioral Health Services 
 Breast Care & Women's Imaging 
 Cancer Program 
 Cardiac Services 
 Diabetes Education 
 Emergency Department 
 Hyperbaric Oxygen Therapy 
 Laboratory Services 
 Orthopaedic Services 
 Pain Management Center 
 Pulmonary Care Services 
 Radiology Services 
 Rehabilitation Services 
 Sleep Disorders Center 
 Stroke Center 
 Surgical Services 
 Women's Health Services

References

External links 
 Marymount Hospital

 
Hospitals in Ohio
Buildings and structures in Cuyahoga County, Ohio
Garfield Heights, Ohio